Grover Stewart (born October 20, 1993) is an American football defensive tackle for the Indianapolis Colts of the National Football League (NFL). He played college football at Albany State.

Professional career
Stewart was drafted by the Indianapolis Colts in the fourth round, 144th overall, in the 2017 NFL Draft.

After being a backup in his first two seasons, Stewart became a full-time starter in 2019. He had his first career sack in Week 2 of 2019. He finished the season playing in all 16 games with 13 starts, recording three sacks, 30 tackles and a pass deflection.

On November 28, 2020, Stewart signed a three-year, $30.75 million contract extension through the 2023 season.

References

External links
Albany State Golden Rams bio
Indianapolis Colts bio

1993 births
Living people
People from Camilla, Georgia
Players of American football from Georgia (U.S. state)
American football defensive tackles
Albany State Golden Rams football players
Indianapolis Colts players